George Brendan Armitage (born March 2, 1942) is an American film director, screenwriter and producer. He directed the films Miami Blues (1990) and Grosse Pointe Blank (1997). He worked frequently with Roger Corman.

Life and career
Armitage was born in Hartford, Connecticut. His mother was a writer who wanted to get into movies, so they moved to Beverly Hills in 1956, when Armitage was 13.

"What a culture shock", he reflected later. "I’m still reeling. In Connecticut there wasn’t a hot rod in sight. Out here it was people racing up and down the street, building their own cars—it was teenage paradise, the kids were running everything." He attended UCLA where he majored in economics and political science. While waiting for his real estate license to come through, Armitage entered the film industry in 1965 via the mail room at 20th Century Fox. He later said:
I have a very personal relationship to film. I've gone to films all the time since I was a kid. I thought I could have some fun trying to make them. I always thought I was pretty close to what people were thinking. There's lots of tricks to be played, things to be done in film. Film is so close to the way the mind works – the way the mind communicates with itself. Film is a dream, an emotional coda.
Armitage later recalled, "The counterculture movement had begun, and the people running Fox, especially in the television division, were these 30-ish hipsters, kind of jazz guys. Suddenly I was a person, being 20 or 21, who could explain to them what was going on, and I became very valuable on the lot." He started writing screenplays in his spare time.

In 1966 Armitage became an associate producer on Peyton Place, "primarily to deal with the young kids on the show, to help them loop their lines." Armitage recalls his period at Fox as an "incredible experience... I went from producer to producer all over the lot pitching ideas, I created series, I wrote a couple of things for television and, about that time, started writing screenplays.

Armitage worked as associate producer on Judd for the Defense and created a TV series and tried to co-produce a TV movie but neither went beyond script stage.

Films
Armitage met Gene and Roger Corman at Fox while they were making The St Valentine's Day Massacre:
The commissary was a place called the "Gold Room" where the producers would go. They were all sort of mothballed, but they still had energy enough to snob the television people, who were making High Noon, Lost in Space, Batman. The movie producers would sit on the other side of the room from the TV people. This left the TV people with nobody else to snob, so they would snob Roger Corman... And that really pissed me off, because I was a fan of his. So I began to visit him on the set and the whole thing, and told him about the conflict that was going on, and he got a kick out of that.
Armitage left Fox in 1967 to focus on movies. He wrote a script called Carrot Butts about animated cartoon characters coming to life. This was sent to the Cormans, who liked it but could not get financing. However Armitage then wrote Gas-s-s-s for him.

Gas-s-s-s impressed Corman enough to allow Armitage to write and direct Private Duty Nurses. Corman optioned an Armitage script, Coming Together.

In 1972 Armitage wrote and directed Hit Man, recently acclaimed in John Cribbs' Obscure Genius series.

In 1975 Armitage was quoted in an article as saying:
I try to follow the Hollywood sports – to see who's winning. It doesn't seem the best system to make films that are both interesting and commercial, but it's the only one that works, at least for me. I think there must be other ways but I can't think of them. It's all new to me, even after ten years. I would like to see more courage and imagination, of course. That's something to look for.

In 1976 he directed Vigilante Force. The picture was not a large success and Armitage's career then became bogged down in "development hell", apart from the movie Hot Rod. Armitage spend the 1980s mostly writing screenplays which were never made.

In 1990 Armitage wrote and directed the film Miami Blues. In 1997 Armitage directed the film Grosse Pointe Blank starring John Cusack and Minnie Driver.

Selected filmography

Director
 The Big Bounce (2004)
 Grosse Pointe Blank (1997)
 Miami Blues (1990)
 Hot Rod (1979) (TV)
 Vigilante Force (1976)
 Hit Man (1972)
 Private Duty Nurses (1971)

Screenwriter
 The Late Shift (1996) (TV)
 Miami Blues (1990)
 The Last of the Finest (1990)
 Hot Rod (1979) (TV)
 Vigilante Force (1976)
 Darktown Strutters (1975)
 Hit Man (1972)
 Night Call Nurses (1972)
 Private Duty Nurses (1971)
 Gas-s-s-s (1971)

Producer
 The Big Bounce (2004)
 Private Duty Nurses (1971)
 Gas-s-s-s (1971)

Actor
 Caged Heat (1974) – Driver
 Von Richthofen and Brown (1971) – Wolff
 Gas-s-s-s (1970) – Billy The Kid

Unmade screenplays
Carrott Butts (late 1960s) – pitched to Roger Corman
Coming Together (1970) for Roger Corman
Trophy (1970s) – story of two police departments who end up in a shooting war
Pochantonas Revenge (1975) – about a miracle staged by a stunt man and special effects person to raise a small town's spirit
Tantruma (1975) for producer Paul Lazarus – about a man looking for a woman from his past

References

External links

Career profile on Armitage at Film Comment

1942 births
American film directors
American male screenwriters
American film producers
American male film actors
Living people
Male actors from Connecticut
University of California, Los Angeles alumni